The 2021–22 McNeese State Cowboys basketball team represented McNeese State University in the 2021–22 NCAA Division I men's basketball season. The Cowboys, led by first-year head coach John Aiken, played their home games at Burton Coliseum until moving to The Legacy Center on January 15, 2022 following hurricane damage repairs, in Lake Charles, Louisiana as members of the Southland Conference.

Previous season 
In a season limited due to the ongoing COVID-19 pandemic, the Cowboys finished the 2020–21 season 10–14, 4–10 in Southland play to finish in tenth place. They lost to Southeastern Louisiana in the first round of the Southland tournament.

Roster

Schedule and results

|-
!colspan=12 style=| Non-conference regular season

|-
!colspan=12 style=| Southland Conference season

|-
!colspan=9 style=| Southland tournament

Source

References

McNeese Cowboys basketball seasons
McNeese State Cowboys
McNeese State Cowboys basketball
McNeese State Cowboys basketball